Pyridine-N-oxide is the heterocyclic compound with the formula C5H5NO.  This colourless, hygroscopic solid is the product of the oxidation of pyridine.  It was originally prepared using peroxyacids as the oxidising agent. The compound is used infrequently as an oxidizing reagent in organic synthesis.

Structure
The structure of pyridine-N-oxide is very similar to that of pyridine with respect to the parameters for the ring. The molecule is planar.  The N-O distance is 1.34Å.  The C-N-C angle is 124°, 7° wider than in pyridine.

Synthesis
The oxidation of pyridine can be achieved with a number of peracids including peracetic acid and perbenzoic acid.  Oxidation can also be effected by a modified Dakin reaction using a urea-hydrogen peroxide complex, and  sodium perborate or, using methylrhenium trioxide as catalyst, with sodium percarbonate.

Reactions
Pyridine N-oxide is five orders of magnitude less basic than pyridine, but it is isolable as a hydrochloride salt, [C5H5NOH]Cl. Further demonstrating its (feeble) basicity, pyridine-N-oxide also serves as a ligand in coordination chemistry.

Treatment of the pyridine-N-oxide with phosphorus oxychloride gives 4- and 2-chloropyridines.

Related pyridine-N-oxides
The N-oxides of various pyridines are  precursors to useful drugs:
Nicotinic acid N-oxide, derived from nicotinic acid is a precursor to niflumic acid and pranoprofen.
2,3,5-trimethylpyridine N-oxide is a precursor to the drug omeprazole
2-chloropyridine N-oxide is a precursor to the fungicide zinc pyrithione

Safety
The compound is a skin irritant.

Further reading
discovery of pyridine-N-oxide: 
Synthesis of N-oxides from substituted pyridines:

References

Amine oxides
Pyridinium compounds
Oxidizing agents